Air & Space/Smithsonian is a quarterly magazine published by the National Air and Space Museum in Washington, D.C., United States. Its first publication was in April 1986. Articles in the magazine involve topics related to aviation and space travel, historical and current. It also covers military aviation and aeronautical technology.

References

External links
 

1986 establishments in Washington, D.C.
Bimonthly magazines published in the United States
History magazines published in the United States
Aviation magazines
Magazines established in 1986
Magazines published in Washington, D.C.
Smithsonian Institution publications